Henry Aaron Field is a baseball stadium located in Lincoln Park, a park in the Milwaukee County Park system, in Glendale, Wisconsin. It is the current home to the Rufus King High School Generals and the Milwaukee Beavers baseball club (Land O' Lakes League). It is named after former Milwaukee and Atlanta Brave and Milwaukee Brewer Hank Aaron.

The University of Wisconsin-Milwaukee Panthers played at Henry Aaron Field from 1994 to 2019. In February 2018, the Panthers reached an agreement to move to Routine Field in Franklin, Wisconsin.

See also
 List of baseball parks in Milwaukee, Wisconsin

References

Buildings and structures in Milwaukee County, Wisconsin
Baseball venues in Wisconsin
Tourist attractions in Milwaukee County, Wisconsin
Sports venues completed in 1957
1957 establishments in Wisconsin
Sports in the Milwaukee metropolitan area